Bajtava is a municipality and village in the Nové Zámky District in the Nitra Region of south-west Slovakia.

History
In historical records the village was first mentioned in 1261.

Geography
It has a population of 388 (2004).

Ethnicity
The population is about 91% Hungarian and 6% Slovak.

Genealogical resources

The records for genealogical research are available at the state archive "Statny Archiv in Nitra, Slovakia"

 Roman Catholic church records (births/marriages/deaths): 1718-1787 (parish B), 1837-1895 (parish A)
 Census records 1869 of Bajtava are not available at the state archive.

See also
 List of municipalities and towns in Slovakia

References

External links

https://web.archive.org/web/20100202015957/http://www.statistics.sk/mosmis/eng/run.html
Surnames of living people in Bajtava
Bajtava – Nové Zámky okolie

Villages and municipalities in Nové Zámky District